Manevychi Raion was a raion in Volyn Oblast in western Ukraine. Its administrative center was the urban-type settlement of Manevychi. The raion was abolished and its territory was merged into Kamin-Kashyrskyi Raion on 18 July 2020 as part of the administrative reform of Ukraine, which reduced the number of raions of Volyn Oblast to four. The last estimate of the raion population was

Notable residents 
 Zygmunt Sierakowski (1826, Lisów – 1863) was one of the leaders of the January Uprising in lands of the former Grand Duchy of Lithuania in the Polish–Lithuanian Commonwealth

See also
 Administrative divisions of Volyn Oblast

References

Former raions of Volyn Oblast
1965 establishments in Ukraine
Ukrainian raions abolished during the 2020 administrative reform